The action of 31 May 1796 was a small action during the French Revolutionary Wars in which a Royal Navy squadron under the command of Commodore Horatio Nelson, in the 64-gun third-rate ship of the line , captured a seven-vessel French convoy that was sailing along the coast from Menton to Vado in the Mediterranean. The British succeeded in capturing the entire convoy, with minimal casualties to themselves.

Nelson had received the news that the French were trying to take supplies to St Pierre d'Acena for the siege of Mantua. He therefore set out to intercept any such attempt. 

When Nelson and his squadron sighted a small convoy of seven sail skirting the coast, he pursued them. The French vessels anchored under the guns of a shore battery and hoisted French flags. Nelson then sent in the squadron's ships' boats to capture the convoy. After a short resistance by an armed tartane of three guns, a gunboat of one gun, and the battery, the British succeeded in taking the vessels. British casualties were one man killed and three wounded. French records place the action off Arma di Taggia and Bussana. 

The vessels the British captured were two naval vessels and five transports. 

Génie, which the British described as a ketch, was armed with three 18-pounder guns and four swivel guns. She had a crew of 60 men, under the command of enseigne de vaisseau Pioch. She was one of 28 merchant tartanes that the French Navy acquired between March and June 1794 at Sète and Agde. Génie, however, was apparently purchased, at Agde, and commissioned in June 1796. The French Navy armed the tartanes with large guns to serve as gunboats.
Numéro Douze (Chaloupe-cannonière №12), was a gunboat of one 18-pounder gun, four swivel guns, and 30 men. Some records report that she was commissioned in 1795 and was under the command of Captain Ganivet at the time of her capture. 
Brig Bonne-Mère, of 250 tons (bm), carrying as cargo brass 24-pounder guns, 13" mortars, and gun carriages;
Ketch Vierge de Consolation, of 120 tons (bm), carrying a cargo of brass guns, mortars, shells, and gun carriages;
Ketch Jean Baptiste, of 100 tons (bm), carrying brandy and a small amount of bread;
A ketch of unknown name of 100 tons (bm), carrying Austrian prisoners; and 
Ketch St. Anne de Paix, of 70 tons (bm), carrying wheelbarrows and entrenching tools. The British destroyed her.

Notes, citations, and references
Notes

Citations

References
 
Fonds Marine. Campagnes (opérations; divisions et stations navales; missions diverses). Inventaire de la sous-série Marine BB4. Tome premier : BB4 1 à 209 (1790-1804) 

  
 

Conflicts in 1796
Naval battles involving France
Naval battles involving Great Britain
Naval battles of the French Revolutionary Wars